Beehive is a British sketch comedy series which was broadcast in 2008. It stars Australian comedian Sarah Kendall and British comedy actresses Alice Lowe, Barunka O'Shaughnessy and Clare Thomson, who wrote much of the show's material. Producer Siobhan Rhodes stated prior to production that the show would be about funny women, who do not feature regularly on TV. The show also features Habib Nasib Nader and Jack Whitehall.

Recurring sketches
The politically incorrect South African flight attendants titled Air Afrikaans is a recurring sketch, as is a parody of Sex and the City.

Reviews
Initial reviews of Beehive praised the show's colourful costumes and inventive material, but the majority drew unfavourable comparisons with earlier all-female comedy show Smack the Pony.

References

External links
 

2008 British television series debuts
2008 British television series endings
2000s British comedy television series
E4 sketch shows
English-language television shows
Television series by Endemol